James B. Pearson (1920–2009) was a U.S. Senator from Kansas from 1962 to 1978. Senator Pearson may also refer to:

Albert J. Pearson (1846–1905), Ohio State Senate
Chip Pearson (politician) (born 1960), Georgia State Senate
Christopher Pearson (Vermont politician) (born 1973), Vermont State Senate
Isaac N. Pearson (1842–1908), Illinois State Senate
J. Richmond Pearson (1930–2014), Alabama State Senate
John James Pearson (1800–1888), Pennsylvania State Senate
John Pearson (politician) (1802–1875), Illinois State Senate
Kirk Pearson (politician), Washington State Senate
Ryan W. Pearson (born 1988), Rhode Island State Senate

See also
William B. C. Pearsons (1825–1898), Massachusetts State Senate